Opuntia auberi is a flower plant species belonging to the family Cactaceae. It is native to Central America in Cuba and the Antilles.

Description 

Opuntia auberi grows in the form of a tree and reaches a height of 3 to 8 meters and more. The branches occur at right angles from the trunk. The stem is cylindrical and has brown color with gloquidia. It is blue-green to gray-green, with large pieces up to 30 centimeters long. The flowers are pink and measure up to 9 cm long.

Taxonomy 
Opuntia auberi was described by Ludwig Karl Georg Pfeiffer and published in Allgemeine Gartenzeitung in 1840.

Etymology 
Opuntia : generic name that comes from the Greek used by Pliny the Elder for a plant that grew around the city of Opus in Greece.

auberi : epithet awarded in honor of the director of the Botanical Garden of Havana Pedro A. Auber.

 Synonyms

Nopalea auberi

Gallery

References 

auberi
Plants described in 1840